Polynema may refer ro:
 Polynema (fungus), a genus of fungi in the family Clavicipitaceae
 Polynema (wasp), a genus of fairyflies or fairy wasps, insects in the family Mymaridae